Marblehead Manor is an American sitcom that originally aired in first-run syndication from September 19, 1987 to May 28, 1988. It starred Paxton Whitehead, Phil Morris, Linda Thorson, Bob Fraser and Michael Richards. The series was a Dames-Fraser Production in association with Paramount Television.

Premise
The series concerned the goings on at the estate of the wealthy, eccentric Randolf Stonehill, heir to a corn oil fortune, and involved long-suffering butler and head of the household staff Albert, who'd known Randolf when they were children; groundskeeper Rick who had eyes for maid Lupe; chauffeur Jerry; handyman Dwayne; and Randolf's materialistic, yet good-hearted wife Hillary. Rounding out the cast was Lupe's mischievous son Elvis.

Cast
 Paxton Whitehead as Albert Dudley
 Linda Thorson as Hillary Stonehill
 Phil Morris as Jerry Stockton
 Rodney Scott Hudson as Dwayne Stockton
 Bob Fraser as Randolf Stonehill
 Dyana Ortelli as Lupe
 Humberto Ortiz as Elvis
 Michael Richards as Rick

Episodes

Broadcast
This show was part of NBC's "Prime Time Begins at 7:30" campaign, in which the network's owned-and-operated stations would run first-run sitcoms in the 7:30–8:00 pm time slot to counter program competing stations' game shows, sitcom reruns and other offerings. The experiment turned out to be a largely unsuccessful one, as only one of the series was a hit while three of the remaining four were canceled after their only season. Marblehead Manor was one of the three that failed to make it to a second season.

Stations

In popular culture
The show is referenced in season 3, episode 4 of The Golden Girls, "Blanche's Little Girl". In one scene, Rose Nylund asks if Blanche Devereaux is upset because of a fight she had with her daughter. Dorothy Zbornak sarcastically responds, "No, Rose, she's upset because Marblehead Manor is only on once a week."
In the season 8 Newhart episode “Cupcake in a Cage”, Larry notes that “Timing is everything in a farce, hence the failure of Marblehead Manor.”

References

External links 
 

1987 American television series debuts
1988 American television series endings
1980s American sitcoms
Television series by CBS Studios
English-language television shows
First-run syndicated television programs in the United States